Helling is a surname. Notable people with the surname include:

Casper Helling (born 1972), Dutch speed skater
Karl Helling (1904–1937), German chess player
Rick Helling (born 1970), American baseball player

See also
Helling, Moselle
Hellings